The Laskin Moot Court Competition, also known as The Laskin Moot, is an annual mooting competition in Canada. It is named after Bora Laskin, the fourteenth Chief Justice of Canada.

Format
The Laskin Moot is unique in Canada as it was originally the only bilingual moot competition in the country, conducted in both of the official languages of English and French. At least one participant of each team must moot in the other language from that used by the other members of the team. The subject of the moot is always in the area of administrative law. The Laskin Moot attracts teams from most of the twenty-three law schools in Canada. It is hosted each year by a different Canadian law school and is held typically in late February or early March.

Locations
The following is a list of law schools that have hosted the Laskin Moot since 1986.

References

External links
 Official website

Law of Canada
Moot court competitions